Terrell State Hospital is a public psychiatric hospital located in Terrell, Texas, United States. Opened in 1885, it was originally known as the North Texas Lunatic Asylum. The original hospital building was built according to the Kirkbride Plan.

Notable people
Oscar Branch Colquitt - 25th Governor of Texas, served on the board of managers.

References

Further reading

External links

1885 establishments in Texas
Hospitals in Texas
Kirkbride Plan hospitals
Hospitals established in 1885